Kavresthali Secondary School was established in 2019 B.S by Mr. Tirtha Prasad Dhakal.

Location
The school is situated in Kavresthali , Kathmandu in the lap of Shivapuri National Park, about 5.5 km far from Balaju,

References

http://www.facebook.com/kavresthalimavi
http://www.blogspot.com/kavresthalimavi

Schools in Kathmandu
Secondary schools in Nepal